Euan Murray (born 20 January 1994) is a Scottish footballer who plays as a defender for Hartlepool United. He began his career at Motherwell and has also played for Arbroath, Clyde, Stenhousemuir, Raith Rovers, Dunfermline Athletic and Kilmarnock, as well as English clubs Barrow and Southport, and in the Solomon Islands for Western United.

Career
Murray is a product of the Motherwell Academy, regularly turning out for their under-20 squad. On 9 November 2013, Murray made his debut for Motherwell as a substitute in a 4–0 defeat against Dundee United.

Having left Motherwell at the end of the 2013–14 season, Murray played as a trialist for Arbroath against Berwick Rangers on 9 August 2014 before signing for Scottish League Two club Clyde on 19 September 2014. On 23 December 2014, he was released by Clyde. In 2015, Murray signed for Western United in the Solomon Islands ahead of their OFC Champions League campaign.

Having returned to Scotland, Murray signed for Stenhousemuir on 8 July 2015, however, he left the club in May 2016 after declining the offer of a new contract to pursue a full-time offer from an English club. On 22 July 2016, Murray signed for English National League club Barrow. He subsequently signed for Southport, before once again returning to Scotland, this time to sign with Scottish League One team Raith Rovers in June 2017.

After two seasons with the Rovers, Murray signed with Fife rivals Dunfermline Athletic in June 2019. Murray spent two season with Dunfermline before leaving the club at the end of his contract in May 2021. He subsequently joined recently relegated Kilmarnock on a two-year deal. He made 38 appearances in all competitions as the club won the Scottish Championship title.

On 24 June 2022, his contract with Kilmarnock had been cancelled by mutual consent. Later on the same day, it was announced that Murray had signed for League Two side Hartlepool United.

International career
Murray played one match for Scotland Under-18s against Serbia in April 2012.

Career statistics

Honours
Kilmarnock
Scottish Championship: 2021–22

Individual
PFA Scotland Team of the Year: 2018–19 Scottish League One, 2020–21 Scottish Championship

References

External links
 
 

1994 births
Living people
Footballers from Bellshill
Scottish footballers
Association football defenders
Hartlepool United F.C. players
Motherwell F.C. players
Arbroath F.C. players
Clyde F.C. players
Stenhousemuir F.C. players
Barrow A.F.C. players
Southport F.C. players
Raith Rovers F.C. players
Dunfermline Athletic F.C. players
Kilmarnock F.C. players
Scottish Professional Football League players
English Football League players
Scotland youth international footballers
Scottish expatriate footballers
Expatriate footballers in the Solomon Islands